This is a list of ambassadors of Germany. Note that some ambassadors are responsible for more than one country while others are directly accredited to Berlin.

Current Ambassadors to Berlin

See also
 Foreign relations of Germany
 List of diplomatic missions of Germany
 List of diplomatic missions in Germany

References

 
 

 
Germany